Skineas is a village and a community on the Paliki peninsula of Cephalonia, Greece. It is 6 km northwest of Lixouri. The community consists of the villages Skineas and Vlychata.

References 

Populated places in Cephalonia